John Burgoyne (died c. 1435), of Dry Drayton, Cambridgeshire, was an English politician.

Family
Burgoyne married and had one daughter and five sons, including the MP, Thomas Burgoyne.

Career
He was a Member (MP) of the Parliament of England for Cambridgeshire in May 1413, 1419, December 1421 and 1433.

References

People from Dry Drayton
English MPs May 1413
English MPs 1419
English MPs December 1421
English MPs 1433